The 1916 Alma Maroon and Cream football team represented the Alma College during the 1916 college football season.

Schedule

References

Alma
Alma Scots football seasons
Alma Maroon and Cream football